Alpine Peak, at  above sea level is a peak in the Sawtooth Range of Idaho. The peak is located in the Sawtooth Wilderness of Sawtooth National Recreation Area in Custer County. Alpine Peak is south of Alpine Lake and east of Sawtooth Lake.

References 

Mountains of Custer County, Idaho
Mountains of Idaho
Sawtooth Wilderness